Holt Creek is a stream in the U.S. states of Nebraska and South Dakota. It is a tributary to the Keya Paha River.

Holt Creek has the name of a local horse thief.

See also
List of rivers of Nebraska
List of rivers of South Dakota

References

Rivers of Keya Paha County, Nebraska
Rivers of Tripp County, South Dakota
Rivers of Nebraska
Rivers of South Dakota